Nigel G. Sharpe ( 23 December 1904 – 3 October 1962) was a British tennis player.

Career
Sharpe represented the Great Britain Davis Cup team in one tie, against Poland in Torquay in 1930, called up to a side weakened by key withdrawals. The British won 5–0, with Sharpe securing wins in both of his singles matches, against Maximilian Stolarow and Ignacy Tłoczyński.

At the 1931 Wimbledon Championships, Sharpe defeated second seed Henri Cochet in the opening round. It was one of three occasions that he made the fourth round at Wimbledon.

His other career singles highlights include winning the Norfolk Championships three times (1931, 1935, 1936) , the Bedford Open three times (1936-38). He also won the Northern Championships in 1931, the Surrey Championships in 1932, the South of England Championships in 1934, and the British Covered Court Championships in 1938.

See also
List of Great Britain Davis Cup team representatives

References

External links
 
 
 

1904 births
1962 deaths
English male tennis players
Tennis people from Greater London
British male tennis players